Street OT is the fourth studio album by Nigerian rapper Olamide. It was released on November 14, 2014 through YBNL Nation. The album is a follow up to his 2013 Baddest Guy Ever Liveth album. Preceded by the singles titled "Story For The Gods" and "Goons Mi", Street OT features guest appearances from Pasuma, Lil Kesh, Chinko Ekun, Phyno, Don Jazzy, and Reminisce. Its production was handled by Pheelz, B-Banks and Young Jonn. The ideology of the title of the album is to glorify and show his love for the "streets", a word with which Olamide is synanimous with.

Critical reception

The release of Street OT was met with mixed reactions from music critics. Hours after its release, the album peaked at the number one spot on iTunes World Albums Chart. Dayo Showemimo of Nigerian Entertainment Today rated the album 3.5 out of 5, adding that “Olamide might not have come into the game with a visible business plan but he’s stayed true and loyal to his chosen genre, he’s loved by the street”. In a contrasting view, Tola Sarumi of NotJustOk rated the album a low 3.5 out of 10, stating that the album “is not a pleasant aural experience, it’s a project cobbled together from leftover tracks.” An editor for BellaNaija rated the album 3 out of 5 and went further to make a verdict, stating: “Street OT is not a stellar Baddo solo project but it’s a nice YBNL showcase album”. Street OT was nominated in the "Album of The Year" category at the 2015 edition of the Nigeria Entertainment Awards.

Accolades
Street OT won Album of the Year and was nominated for Best Rap Album at The Headies 2015. It was also nominated for Album of the Year at the 2015 Nigeria Entertainment Awards.

Track listing

Personnel

Olamide Adedeji - Primary artist
Pheelz - Primary producer
Young John - Primary producer 
B-Banks - Secondary producer
Wasiu Alabi Pasuma - Featured artist 
Michael Collins Ajereh - Featured artist
Remilekun Abdulkalid Safaru - Featured artist 
Azubuike Chibuzo Nelson - Featured artist
Lil Kesh - Featured artist 
Viktoh - Featured artist
Chinko Ekun - Featured artist
Chuks - Featured artist

Release history

References

2014 albums
Igbo-language albums
Albums produced by Pheelz
Yoruba-language albums
Olamide albums
Gangsta rap albums by American artists
Albums produced by Young John (producer)
Albums produced by B.Banks
YBNL Nation albums